Syed Muhammad Ashiq Hussain Shah (born 27 August 1984) is a Pakistani politician who had been a member of the National Assembly of Pakistan, from June 2013 to May 2018.

Early life
He was born on 27 August 1984.

Political career

He was elected to the National Assembly of Pakistan as a candidate of Pakistan Muslim League (N) (PML-N) from Constituency NA-145 (Okara-III) in 2013 Pakistani general election. He received 89,025 votes and defeated an independent candidate, Rana Khizar Hayat Khan.

During his tenure as Member of the National Assembly, he served as the Federal Parliamentary Secretary for Railways.

References

Living people
Pakistan Muslim League (N) politicians
Punjabi people
Pakistani MNAs 2013–2018
1984 births